Aerial America is a television series airing on the Smithsonian Channel. Each episode is an aerial video tour of a U.S. state or destination in the United States. The narrated show consists entirely of aerial scenes using the Cineflex V14HD gyro-stabilized camera system mounted under the "chin" of a helicopter. It features flyovers of historical landmarks, natural areas such as national parks, and well-known buildings and homes in urban areas. The series has aired an episode for each state as well as others that have showcased popular destinations such as Hollywood and small towns in the U.S.

On November 4, 2019, it was announced that the series was revived and returned with three new episodes on December 8, 2019.

In 2015 the program was nominated for a Webby Award in the "best television website" category.

Episodes

References

External links 
 Aerial America at the Smithsonian Channel
 

2010 American television series debuts
2019 American television series endings
2010s American documentary television series
English-language television shows
Smithsonian Channel
Smithsonian Channel original programming